A.D. Atlante, or better known as Atlante, was a professional soccer team in El Salvador.

History
Atlante played in San Salvador. The club was previously called Guardia Nacional'', however in the 1955–1956 season they changed their name to AD Atlante after they won promotion to the country's top tier.

Atlante never won a national title in El Salvador. However, they did manage to finish second in the 1956–1957 national regular season league, and as runners-up again in 1962. In 1970 they were relegated to the second division.

Honours

Domestic championshipsPrimera División de Fútbol de El Salvador'''
Runner-up (2): 1956-1957, 1962

Records

Club Records
 First Match (prior to creation of a league): vs. TBD (a club from TBD), Year
 First Match (official): vs. TBD, year
 Most points in La Primera: 00 points (00 win, 00 draws, 0 losses) Year/Year
 Least points in La Primera: 00 points (0 win, 0 draws, 00 losses) Year/year

Individual records
 Most capped player for El Salvador: 50 (0 whilst at Atlante), TBD
 Most international caps for El Salvador while a Atlante player: 1, TBD
 Most goals in a season, all competitions: unknown player, O (Year/year) (00 in League, 00 in Cup competitions)
 Most goals in a season, La Primera: TBD, 7

Historical Matches

List of notable players
  Mauricio Rodriguez
  Salvador Mariona
  Raul Corcio Zavaleta
  Jorge Lino Romero
  Tomás Gamboa

Team captains

List of coaches
  Conrado Miranda (1962)
  Ranchero Guerra (1962)
  Marcelo Estrada (1965–1966)
  José Santacolomba (1967–1968)
  Carlos Javier Mascaro (1969–1970)
  Rigoberto Guzmán
  Gregorio Bundio
  Hugo Arias
  Andrés “el doctorcito” Huezo
 Mario Osorto

References

Defunct football clubs in El Salvador
Association football clubs established in 1955
1955 establishments in El Salvador